Gundars Upenieks (born 31 March 1971) is a Latvian biathlete. He competed at the 1992, 1994, 1998 and the 2002 Winter Olympics. From 2002 until 2006 Upenieks was the secretary general of the Latvian Biathlon federation. Since 2013 he is a vice president of Latvian Biathlon federation.

References

1971 births
Living people
Latvian male biathletes
Olympic biathletes of Latvia
Biathletes at the 1992 Winter Olympics
Biathletes at the 1994 Winter Olympics
Biathletes at the 1998 Winter Olympics
Biathletes at the 2002 Winter Olympics
People from Madona